Gaon Ki Gori  is a 1945 Indian Bollywood film. It was the second highest grossing Indian film of 1945. Directed by K. Amarnath, The cast included Noor Jehan, Durga Khote, Nazir, Jagdish Sethi,  Mishra, Shanta Patel, Ibrahim, Nawaz, Chandrika, Ghosh, Rama Shukul, Anant Marathe, Rajkumari Shukla, Bikram Kapoor, Geeta Nizami, Rajkumari Kapoor, Ghulam Rasool and M.A. Khan.

A noteworthy feature of this film is that it has the first Hindi song sung by the legendary Mohammad Rafi. That song marked the launch of a long and distinguished career as a playback singer for Mohammed Rafi.

Cast
Noor Jehan
Durga Khote
Nazir
Jagdish Sethi
Mishra
Shanta Patel
Ibrahim
Nawaz
Chandrika
Ghosh
Rama Shukul
Anant Marathe
Rajkumari Shukla
Bikram Kapoor
Geeta Nizami
Rajkumari Kapoor
Ghulam Rasool
M.A. Khan.

Soundtrack
The music of the film was composed by Shyam Sunder with lyrics by Wali Saheb.

References

External links
 

1945 films
1940s Hindi-language films
Hindi films remade in other languages
Indian drama films
1945 drama films
Indian black-and-white films
Films directed by K. Amarnath
Hindi-language drama films